The 1926 East Tennessee State Teachers football team was an American football team that represented East Tennessee State Teacher's College—now known as East Tennessee State University (ETSU)—as an independent in the 1926 college football season. They were led by second-year coach John Robinson. Robinson gained a new assistant coach in William "Willie" Flinn Rogers, who taught history and government at the school from 1925 to 1968. Shelby Clark was the team captain. The Teachers finished with a record of 2–4–1.

Schedule

References

East Tennessee State Teachers
East Tennessee State Buccaneers football seasons
East Tennessee State Teachers football